The FIE Fencing World Cup is an international fencing competition held by the Fédération Internationale d'Escrime. In each weapon (Men's and Women's Épée, Sabre and Foil), three Grand Prix, five World Cup events and several satellite events are contested each season. The five top results as well as the Olympic Games or World Fencing Championships and zonal championships results are taken into account for each fencer's rankings. For teams, up to five World Cup events are held each year. The four top results as well as the Olympic Games or World Fencing Championships and zonal championships are taken into account for each country's rankings.

Individual World Cup

Formula 

World Cup competitions are governed by the FIE rules for competitions. World Cups and Grand Prix are organised according to a mixed system consisting of one round of pools and a preliminary direct elimination table, followed by a main direct elimination table of 64 fencers.

The 16 top-ranked fencers in FIE rankings are exempt from the qualification phase and access directly the table of 64. All other competitors fence in pools of 7 fencers, or a mix of pools of 6 and pools of 7 if the number of fencers is not divisible by 7. The composition of the pools takes into account FIE rankings and the nationality of the fencers. Pools bouts last 3 minutes, or until a fencer has scored 5 hits. Fencers are ranked according to, successively:
 the ratio of victory per bout;
 the difference between the total number of hits scored and the total number of hits received;
 the total number of hits scored.

The 16 top-ranked fencers after the pools phase access directly the table of 64. The other fences compete in direct elimination tables until 32 fencers are selected to complete the table of 64. Direct elimination bouts last for three periods of three minutes, with a one-minute rest between each period, or until a fencer has scored 15 hits.

Medal record

Team World Cup

See also

Fencing at the Summer Olympics
World Fencing Championships
Asian Fencing Championships
European Fencing Championships

References

External links
FIE Fencing

 
Fencing competitions
World cups
Recurring sporting events established in 1972
Annual sporting events